The Smallville Roleplaying Game is a superhero-themed role-playing game  published in 2010 by Margaret Weis Productions, and is set in the universe of the television series Smallville. The Smallville Roleplaying Game was the first of the new role-playing games from Margaret Weis Productions to utilize their new Cortex Plus system. The Smallville Roleplaying Game was designed by the game's line developer Cam Banks and indie role-playing game publisher Josh Roby.

The Smallville Roleplaying Game is designed to allow Clark Kent and Lois Lane to be played on almost equal terms; it does this by focusing on story and inter-personal conflict rather than raw power.

Setting

There are two main ways to run the Smallville Roleplaying Game. One option is to use the official Smallville setting. Alternately, the life-path system in Smallville encourages you to create an original setting involving a coming-of-age drama with superpowers. The example of character creation in the rulebook demonstrates how to create Smallville itself using the character creation rules in the role-playing game and the season 9 protagonists Clark Kent, Lois Lane, Chloe Sullivan, Tess Mercer, and General Zod.

Life Paths
Character generation in the Smallville RPG is a collaborative process, with characters going through their lives together step by step and deciding how their histories are woven together. The process starts with their Origin (Rich, Ordinary, Gifted, Strange, and Alien or Metahuman), with each character establishing the very earliest statements of their values, and how important they hold them, how they relate to others, and any resources or powers they may have. This is all written down and drawn by everyone on a large piece of paper, before everyone moves forward to their youth and develops their values (Duty, Glory, Justice, Love, Power and Truth), their relationships, and their powers and resources accordingly. This process involves creating the most important NPCs and locations in the setting as far as the characters are concerned, and indicating how strongly the various PCs value them.

Each value and each relationship (with another player character or non-player character) is given a replacement statement whenever the value is changed, as well as a value. Two characters with equal values on Power are very different if one has the statement "Power is a means to my ends" and the other has "I need Power to keep myself safe". The gamemaster (known as Watchtower) is encouraged to create sessions through a process of "Wedging" — creating adversaries that will put characters at odds with each other through their values or relationships.

System
Smallville was the first iteration of Cortex Plus and is so far the only iteration of Cortex Plus Drama outside the generic Cortex Plus Hackers' Guide. This means that it's a roll-and-keep system where the players roll the dice in the dice pool and keep best two. Almost invariably they are rolling one Value and one Relationship, and may roll other dice from other factors like preparation and powers. The two sides roll off and highest wins. The loser can choose to give in (and narrate how they are defeated) or they can choose to keep fighting and take Stress (i.e. Damage). There are five different stress tracks (Afraid, Insecure, Injured, Exhausted and Angry) and too much in any of the stress tracks can overwhelm any character.

The most powerful move can make in the Smallville RPG is to challenge either one of their relationships, or one of their values. This means that the other players think that other player was wrong and are coming to a new understanding; the players get to roll the dice three times rather than once in own dice pool but are using a smaller dice for the rest of the session.

Supplements
There have been two published supplements for the Smallville RPG before Margaret Weis Productions lost the license at the end of February 2013: Smallville: The High School Yearbook (for playing high school characters using the Smallville system) and Smallville: The Watchtower Report.

Reception

The game won a Judge's Spotlight Award at the 2011 ENnies.

When it was produced the reception was positive but surprised, with RPGamer declaring: "The Smallville RPG is perhaps the most peculiar release of this year. Everything about its cover screams 'mediocre at best' — the cable television series license, the Margaret Weis productions and Cortex System logos, even the studio promo picture recycled as cover art would have led to plummeting expectations. ... But this volume proves that one should never judge a book by its cover. You should instead judge a book by its inside cover, which features a crew of up-and-coming indie designers in the main credits and laundry list of Evil Hat veterans in the special thanks section. If covers aren't enough a read-through, will reveal that Smallville is a great story game ideally suited for teen drama that has been cunningly disguised as a cheap TV tie-in".

io9 was equally surprised: "So I'll admit that when I saw the Margaret Weis Productions booth at Gen Con stacked with Supernatural, Smallville and Serenity RPGs, a small voice in the back of my head was saying, 'These could be pretty bad'. I have tied the small voice up securely and locked it the trunk of my car, because it was very wrong. The Smallville RPG is a finely crafted game that understands the quirks of the show and the things about it that its fans love, then wraps the game around those core values rather than tying them on as window dressing".

See also
Marvel Heroic Roleplaying
Leverage: The Roleplaying Game
Cortex System
Monsterhearts

References

DC Comics role-playing games
ENnies winners
Margaret Weis Productions games
Role-playing games based on television series
Role-playing games introduced in 2010
Smallville